Conchicolites is a fossil genus of cornulitid tubeworms. Their shells lack vesicular wall structure and have a smooth lumen. They are externally covered with transverse ridges. Some species have spines. They usually occur as encrusters on various shelly fossils. Their fossils are known from the Late Ordovician to the Devonian.

References

Tentaculita
Silurian animals
Devonian animals
Late Devonian animals
Fossils of Sweden
Fossils of the Czech Republic
Letná Formation
Protostome enigmatic taxa